Richford is a town in Franklin County, Vermont, United States, located along the Canada–United States border. The population was 2,346 at the 2020 census.

Richford is the birthplace of R. G. LeTourneau, an industrialist who founded LeTourneau University in Longview, Texas.

Richford is the eastern terminus of the Missisquoi Valley Rail-Trail.

Geography
Richford is located in the northeast corner of Franklin County, bordered to the north by the Brome-Missisquoi Regional County Municipality in the Montérégie region of Quebec in Canada. Orleans County, Vermont, is to the east. Richford, the primary community, is in the northwest part of the town along the Missisquoi River. Vermont Route 105 passes through the center of town, leading east across the Green Mountains to North Troy and southwest to Enosburg Falls. Vermont Route 139 leads north from the center of Richford  to the international border.

The Missisquoi River enters from Canada and exits to the south; there are no significant lakes or ponds.

Surrounding areas
 North: Quebec, Canada: East Pinnacle, Abercorn, Glen Sutton, Alva, Domaine Mont Louis, Sutton
 East: Jay
 Southeast: Westfield
 South: Montgomery
 Southwest: Enosburgh
 West: Berkshire

History

On 8 October 1908 a grain elevator owned by the Canadian Pacific Railroad exploded, killing thirteen.

Government
The Essex-Orleans Senate district includes the town of Richford, as well as parts or all of Essex County, Orleans County, Franklin County and Lamoille County. It is represented in the Vermont Senate by Vincent Illuzzi (R) and Robert A. Starr (D).

Demographics

As of the census of 2000, there were 2,321 people, 899 households, and 613 families residing in the town.  The population density was 53.7 people per square mile (20.7/km2).  There were 1,017 housing units at an average density of 23.5 per square mile (9.1/km2).  The racial makeup of the town was 97.72% White, 0.34% African American, 0.95% Native American, 0.04% Asian, 0.17% from other races, and 0.78% from two or more races. Hispanic or Latino of any race were 0.69% of the population.

There were 899 households, out of which 32.5% had children under the age of 18 living with them, 51.7% were married couples living together, 11.3% had a female householder with no husband present, and 31.8% were non-families. 25.7% of all households were made up of individuals, and 12.3% had someone living alone who was 65 years of age or older.  The average household size was 2.53 and the average family size was 2.98.

In the town, the population was spread out, with 25.9% under the age of 18, 7.6% from 18 to 24, 27.2% from 25 to 44, 22.2% from 45 to 64, and 17.1% who were 65 years of age or older.  The median age was 38 years. For every 100 females, there were 93.6 males.  For every 100 women age 18 and over, there were 90.2 men.

The median income for a household in the town was $28,125, and the median income for a family was $32,016. Males had a median income of $26,607 versus $20,731 for females. The per capita income for the town was $14,368.  About 16.9% of families and 21.0% of the population were below the poverty line, including 30.6% of those under age 18 and 14.4% of those age 65 or over.

National Register of Historic Places

Several buildings and structures are listed on the National Register of Historic Places, including St. Ann's Episcopal Church, the Sheldon Boright House, the F.W. Wheeler House, the Richford Primary School, the Missisquoi River Bridge, and the Downtown Richford Historic District.

Notable people

John Blaisdell Corliss, U.S. congressman from Michigan
E. Henry Powell, state auditor
Max L. Powell, President of the Vermont State Senate
Percival L. Shangraw, Chief Justice of the Vermont Supreme Court

See also 
Franklin County
North Branch Missisquoi River, designated Rivière Sutton in Quebec
Missisquoi River

References

External links
 Town of Richford official website
 Virtual Vermont Richford page

 
Towns in Vermont
Burlington, Vermont metropolitan area
Towns in Franklin County, Vermont